Küre District is a district of the Kastamonu Province of Turkey. Its seat is the town of Küre. Its area is 406 km2, and its population is 5,431 (2021).

Composition
There is one municipality in Küre District:
 Küre

There are 34 villages in Küre District:

 Afşargüney
 Afşarimam
 Ahmetbeşe
 Alacık
 Avcıpınar
 Belören
 Beşören
 Beyalan
 Bürüm
 Cambaz
 Camili
 Çatak
 Çatköy
 Çaybükü
 Ersizler
 Ersizlerdede
 Güllüce
 Güneyköy
 İğdir
 İkizciler
 İmralı
 Karadonu
 Karaman
 Kayadibi
 Kesepınar
 Koyunkırtık
 Kozköy
 Kösreli
 Köstekçiler
 Sarpun
 Sipahiler
 Taşpınar
 Topçu
 Uzunöz

References

Districts of Kastamonu Province